The Four  Whiteheads  of  Mount Shang were four elders who had an important role in the establishment of the Han dynasty of China (206 BCE – 220 CE).

Liu Ying (Emperor Hui of Han, 210–188 BCE) became the second emperor of the Chinese Han dynasty. When his father (the Emperor Gaozu of Han), the previous emperor, died of an arrow wound, Liu Ying became emperor because his father had named him crown prince and heir to the throne. 

This was a most notable moment, because the founding of the Han dynasty affected the entire history of China. Han Huidi was important because he represented the dynastic succession of the Liu family as the Han dynasty. His father named him crown prince and heir due to the influence of the Four Whiteheads of Mount Shang. These men were considered sages: they were called "whiteheads" because they were elders with white hair and white beards.

Dynastic determinations

Soon after establishing the Han dynasty, the new emperor, Emperor Gaozu of Han, was eager to recruit talented persons. In 196 BCE Gao even issued a decree to the effect that any official knowing of a virtuous man must so report on penalty of being fired (unless that man were too old or sick). Sometime before or after that, Gao attempted to obtain the services of  the Four  Whiteheads of Mount Shang: Master Dongyuan, Qi Liji, Master Xiahuang and Mr. Lu Li. ("Huang and Qi", 黃綺, was a poetic shorthand for these four, as used by Tao Yuanming.) During the time of troubles which characterized the Qin dynasty (221 to 206 BCE), these four had entered into a life of seclusion on Mount Shang. They were old and had white hair and beards: thus they were known as the Four Whiteheads of Mount Shang. Liu Bang (the future emperor Han Gaodi)  was well aware of the reputation of these four sages, and when he became emperor Gao, the four refused his ardent entreaties to assume positions of importance in his newly established government. When the question of who was to be imperial heir came up, two of Gaodi's women both advocated for their own son: Lu Hou for Ying and Qi for her own son. Gao favored Qi's son, as he thought the youth embodied more of his personality. Lu Hou got the advantage: she went to the powerful official Zhang Liang, who said, “His Majesty had long heard about the Four Whiteheads of  Mount Shang and wanted to invite them to serve the country. However, they refused. If  the Crown Prince could obtain the support of the Four Whiteheads of  Mount Shang, then His Majesty would not depose him.” Lu Hou then applied her forces of persuasion. The Four Whiteheads of Mount Shang showed up at court. The four agreed that according to the Confucian precepts of filial piety, as the elder son the future Huidi should succeed to the rulership, and that furthermore Liu Ying's nature was benevolent and compassionate. Gaodi noticed the presence of four elders with white hair and white beards at his court, and inquired as to their identity. Upon finding out who they were and what their position was, Gaodi went to Lady Qi and told her: “I cannot appoint your son as the successor because the Crown Prince has already obtained the support of such capable people. His position is firmly entrenched.”

Thus the future direction of the Han dynasty was determined.

See also
Emperor Gaozu of Han
Emperor Hui of Han
Empress Lü
Family tree of the Han Dynasty
Zhang Liang (Western Han)

Reference citations

Standard Chinese secondary reference sources
These Classical Chinese historical sources are standard on this topic, and incorporated herein:

 Sima Tan and Sima Qian. Records of the Grand Historian, vol. 9 (on or around 94 BCE).
 Ban Biao, Ban Gu, and Ban Zhao. Book of Han, vol. 2 (111 CE).
 Sima Guang, et al. Zizhi Tongjian (Comprehensive Mirror in Aid of Governance), vols. 9, 11, 12 (1084).

Other references

 Chinese emperors